West Trenton station is the northern terminus of the SEPTA West Trenton Line. It is located at Grand & Railroad Avenues in the West Trenton section of Ewing Township, New Jersey, United States, however this address only applies to the southbound station house on the west side of the tracks. The northbound station house is on the east side of the tracks and is located on Sullivan Way, which changes into Grand Avenue once it crosses under the tracks. SEPTA's official website gives the address as being in Trenton. The station has off-street parking, and is located in Fare Zone NJ.  In FY 2013, West Trenton station had a weekday average of 292 boardings and 361 alightings.

History

Originally built in 1929 by the Reading Railroad, it was acquired by Conrail and SEPTA in 1976 and used for diesel service to Newark, New Jersey until 1981. New Jersey Transit took over passenger service between here and Newark until November 1982, thus transforming the station into a terminus. It has been listed on the National Register of Historic Places since June 22, 1984. NRHP lists the northbound station house as the official address, which now consists of privately owned offices. There is an ongoing debate concerning a proposal to rename the station as "Ewing".  This station is where the proposed New Jersey Transit West Trenton Line would terminate. As of August 25, 2015 as a result of the SEPTA and CSX separation between Woodbourne and West Trenton stations, the outbound platform was removed for the now CSX track to run around the SEPTA West Trenton yard and continue to Manville while all SEPTA traffic was diverted onto the Inbound track. Currently all SEPTA Service between Yardley and West Trenton operates on the Inbound track only.

The station was built in the Georgian Revival style as adapted for a medium-sized suburban station. It has a central two-story 
block constructed of brick and a hipped slate roof. The gable projects slightly on the east and west facades. Two one-story wings with slate roofs extend from the central block.

Station layout
West Trenton consists of a single low-level side platform.

See also
Operating Passenger Railroad Stations Thematic Resource (New Jersey)
West Trenton Railroad Bridge

References

External links

SEPTA - West Trenton Station
Mercer County, New Jersey History Website
 Grand Avenue entrance from Google Maps Street View
Flickr images (three pages)

Railway stations in Mercer County, New Jersey
Ewing Township, New Jersey
SEPTA Regional Rail stations
Former Reading Company stations
Former Baltimore and Ohio Railroad stations
Railway stations in the United States opened in 1929
Railway stations on the National Register of Historic Places in New Jersey
National Register of Historic Places in Mercer County, New Jersey
1929 establishments in New Jersey